Paranomus dregei, the scented sceptre, is a flowering shrub belonging to the genus Paranomus. The plant is native to the Western Cape, South Africa.

Description

Fire destroys the plant but the seeds survive. The plant is bisexual and pollinated by insects. The fruit ripens two months after flowering and the seeds fall to the ground where they are spread by ants.

Distribution and habitat
The plant occurs from the Witteberg to the Swartberg, Anysberg, Touwsberg and Rooiberg, Kouga Mountains and Outeniqua Mountains.

Gallery

References

dregei